Isaac Richard Kai Pearce (born 27 October 1998) is an English professional footballer who plays for Weston-super-Mare, as a striker.

Career
Pearce was born in Bristol. After spending time with Bristol Rovers, Fulham, Bath City and Larkhall Athletic, Pearce signed for Forest Green Rovers in June 2018. He made his professional debut on 28 August 2018, in the EFL Cup, and he scored his first professional goal in a 4-0 EFL Trophy win over Cheltenham Town on 4 September 2018. In December 2018 he moved on loan to Gloucester City for one month. He returned to Forrest on 11 January 2019. He was released by Forest Green Rovers at the end of the 2018–19 season.

On 25 June 2019, Pearce signed for Southern Football League club Weston-super-Mare.

References

1998 births
Living people
English footballers
Bristol Rovers F.C. players
Fulham F.C. players
Bath City F.C. players
Larkhall Athletic F.C. players
Forest Green Rovers F.C. players
Gloucester City A.F.C. players
Weston-super-Mare A.F.C. players
Association football forwards
English Football League players
Footballers from Bristol